Greek National Road 34 (abbreviated as EO34) is a single carriageway road in the Pelion peninsula, central Greece. It connects Volos with Tsagkarada, via Agria, Kala Nera and Neochori. 

Roads in Thessaly
34